Wine for the Confused is a documentary hosted by John Cleese. It is a light-hearted introduction to wine for novices. Cleese guides viewers through the basics of wine types and grape varieties, wine making, wine tasting and terminology, buying and storing wines, through direct narrative and interviews with wine makers and wine sellers.  The film duration is 92 minutes and includes visits to wineries in California.  The film concludes with a large group conducting a blind wine tasting.  One of the tasting results was the fact that most tasters could not distinguish between red wine and white wine.  Another was that most tasters rated an inexpensive wine equal in taste to an expensive prestige wine, and both of these out scored the rest of the mid-priced and high-priced wines in the blind test.

References

External links

American documentary television films
2004 television films
2004 films
Documentary films about wine
Films shot in California
Wine tasting
Works by John Cleese
2000s English-language films
2000s American films